Eric Gemmell (7 April 1921 – 23 February 2008) was an English footballer who played for Oldham Athletic, Crewe Alexandra and Rochdale.

He began his career on the books of Manchester United and Manchester City but without making a first team appearance due to being called up to serve in the Royal Navy during WW2.

In January 1952 He scored seven goals in one game for Oldham Athletic.

In the 1954–55 and 1955-56 seasons he was top goal scorer for Rochdale.

Gemmell died on 23 February 2008.

References

Manchester United F.C. players
Manchester City F.C. players
Oldham Athletic A.F.C. players
Crewe Alexandra F.C. players
Rochdale A.F.C. players
Ashton United F.C. players
Buxton F.C. players
Nantlle Vale F.C. players
English footballers
Footballers from Manchester
1921 births
2008 deaths
Association football forwards